Shahla Aghapour also known as Shahla Aghapour-Benakohell (شهلا آقاپور) (born in Tehran) is an Iranian artist, author and gallery director living in Germany.  She works both as a writer and poet, as well as a painter, sculptor, performance artist and director of Galerie-Benakohell.

Biography 
Shahla Aghapour worked as a freelance artist in Berlin and has exhibited her works and readings in Germany and other countries. She completed a Master of Art at the Berlin University of the Arts in Art in Context in 2003 and works as an art teacher and head of artistic projects.

Shahla Aghapour is a member of the Federal Association of Artists in Germany, PEN Center of writers in exile of German-speaking countries and was from 2007 to 2009 chairman of the Iranian Writers' Association in exile. Aghapour is also a member of the “Group Seven” collective: a group of five Iranian women artists living and working in Germany, with a focus on women and social, cultural, and political issues around the world, especially relating to Iran.

Work

Exhibitions 
This is a list of select exhibitions, in order by date.

1996 – Cultural Center Spandau, Berlin, Germany
 1997 – Landtag of Prussian, gallery in parliament Berlin House of Representatives, Germany
 2008 – Island Gallery, Berlin, Germany
 2009 - "Iranian night" (in book week of Germany), exhibition of painting about woman face and body, wives of current and former presidents of Germany had joined to the meeting
 2011 – Hilton Hotel, Houston, Texas, United States
 2011 – Persian Culture Center, Dallas/Richardson, Texas, United States
 2012 – Salon Exil, Berlin, Germany
 2015 – Galerie-Benakohell, Berlin, Germany

Readings 

 Culture Club, Zurich, Switzerland
 Cultural Association, Lugano, Switzerland
 2011 – Persian Culture Center, Dallas/Richardson, Texas, United States

Publications 

 Sarate garme hes (Parts of Emotions), (in Persian), Aida Publishing, Bochum, Germany
 Ashovtegieh Djahan (Chaos of the Cosmos), (in Persian), Aida Verlag, Bochum, Germany
 Parvaze sorkhe tan (Flying red bodies), (in Persian), Fourough Books Publishing, Cologne, Germany
 Oliver Twist in Tehran, (in German), POP Publishing, Ludwigsburg, Germany
 Morvarid-e Siah (The Black Pearl) – (in Persian), Aida Publishing, Bochum, Germany

References

External links 

 Website of Shahla Aghapour
 About her lyrik work
 About her art and gallery work
 Press review
 Museum Colgne, Germany
 Iran Tribune
 Iranian Artist Site

Iranian women painters
Living people
Writers from Tehran
Iranian painters
Iranian emigrants to Germany
21st-century German women artists
21st-century Iranian women artists
Berlin University of the Arts alumni
Year of birth missing (living people)